Timi Hilly Garstang (born 21 July 1987 in Orange County, California, United States) is an American-born Marshallese track athlete. He represented his country at the 2012 Summer Olympics in the Men's 100 meters and finished last in the qualifying heats with a time of 12.81 seconds. His time was over a second behind the next placed runner, Patrick Tuara, who had a time of 11.72 seconds.

References

External links
 

Marshallese male sprinters
American male sprinters
Athletes (track and field) at the 2012 Summer Olympics
1987 births
Living people
Olympic track and field athletes of the Marshall Islands
Sportspeople from Orange County, California
American people of Marshallese descent
Track and field athletes from California